The Itaewon Burger King Murder took place on April 3, 1997 when 22-year-old Hongik University student  Jo Jung-pil (Hangul: 조중필; born 1974) was stabbed to death at Burger King in Itaewon. Arthur Patterson, 17 at the time of the incident (born to an American father and a South Korean mother), was the main suspect. Patterson and his friend Edward Lee were arrested but they were released by the Supreme Court in 1998 due to lack of evidence and Patterson was banned from travelling to South Korea. In October 2012 it was announced Patterson will face extradition by South Korean police after a DNA test indicated traces of Jo's DNA, when Lee's didn't.

Arthur Patterson
Patterson was born in Los Angeles, California to a Caucasian American father and Korean mother. Patterson's father was a former soldier stationed in South Korea (where he met his wife). Arthur was described as a "Mexican gangster" who disrespected his family frequently and had alleged gang ties. At age 16, Patterson may have had previous legal arrests as a juvenile, may have been arrested and served 16 months in juvenile hall in California. Patterson's father was an American soldier based in Korea at the time of the incident. There, he met Korean American youth Edward Lee who was the son of a wealthy Korean family, living most of his life in the USA.

Murder of Jo Jung-Pil
Edward Lee and Arthur Patterson with 20 other male (mostly Korean-American youths) and female teenagers were hanging out on the 4th floor of a building in Itaewon on April 3, 1997, where they went to the first floor of the same building to order hamburgers from a Burger King outlet. As Patterson used his knife to cut his hamburger, the group started the conversation about knives. After the rest of the group went back to the 4th floor, Patterson and his friend Lee went to the bathroom, where they coincidentally came in contact with Jo Jung-Pil and stabbed him 9 times in the carotid artery using the knife. On April 4, the Department of the Army Criminal Investigation Division (CID) received an anonymous report and arrested Patterson. On April 6, after seeing Edward Lee on TV, Lee's father who returned from a business trip investigated him, as Lee denied his crime they met with a lawyer and confessed to the crime on April 8.

Murder controversy

The case became complicated as South Korean investigators did not investigate the case properly. The case had been investigated by Army CID, who gathered enough evidence to prosecute Patterson. As the South Korean investigators could not speak English, they also had problems interrogating which slowed down their initial investigation.  Both Patterson and Lee also claimed that the other person committed the actual murder. Also, people found it very suspicious that the crime scene was cleaned spotless after only two days, which is very unusual. In addition, the Status of Forces Agreement (SOFA) caused problems in finding witnesses and investigation.

Lee was convicted of murder while Patterson was convicted of possession of weapon.  After the first trial for the murder, it was ruled that Lee was guilty of murder. Lee was later acquitted by the Supreme Court of South Korea because of insufficient evidence. Patterson was convicted for possession of weapons and abandoned his appeal but was released from prison after his sentence was stopped. In the midst of this, the Ministry of Justice (Republic of Korea) did not extend the foreign travel ban for Patterson, three days before the foreign travel ban began he decided to depart to the United States making further investigation difficult. The family of Jo Jong-pil claimed damages against the country for being negligent during the first and second trial. The Supreme Court of Korea ruled that "the relationship between the negligence of the prosecutor and the bereaved families of the mentally damage is recognized".

Prosecution of Patterson was requested by Jo Jong-pil's family, after the film The Case of Itaewon Homicide was released, due to high public demand, another judgement had to be made.  The prosecutors at the Department of Justice petitioned for extradition on December 15, 2009.

Current status
After the murder case, Jo Jong-pil's parents requested a reinvestigation and Patterson the lead suspect who left to another country to attend, but the Ministry of Justice and Ministry of Foreign Affairs responded they couldn't find him which slowed down the process. In 2009, the film adaptation of The Case of Itaewon Homicide and SBS's program I Want to Know It broadcast an episode multiple times and interest in the topic renewed. On October 10, 2011 it was reported that suspect Patterson was arrested and would be sent back to Korea with the cooperation of authorities. Patterson was arrested by the United States police and the United States California Court sentencing stated, "relating to Patterson's repatriation, custody of the prisoner is allowed while bail is denied".

Patterson left the country once he was judged innocent on other charges, it remains a controversy whether the statute of limitations was stopped in the legal community. If 'in a foreign country to escape criminal actions' isn't proven, meaning if the statute of limitations isn't stopped until 15 years past the murder date, the statute of limitation will expire in April 2012. To avoid the controversy of statute of limitations completion, prosecutors announced in December 2011 that Arthur Patterson would be prosecuted. Thus, on December 22, 2011 Arthur Patterson was prosecuted by the South Korean prosecutors.
 
The United States attorney responsible for the repatriation said that the two were accomplices. After investigation by South Korean prosecutors it was said they were accomplices and Patterson killed the victim, and Lee instructed the murder. However, the possibility for indictment of Lee has remained unclear.

October 2012, the U.S. federal court in Los Angeles ruled for Patterson to be extradited to South Korea.

However, Patterson submitted a habeas corpus petition to the federal court in the U.S. state of California, delaying his extradition. He was in custody at the Los Angeles Downtown Federal Detention Center.

Final Sentencing
18 years after the crime, in September 2015, Patterson was extradited to Seoul to stand trial for the murder.  Patterson continued to claim his innocence throughout the trial, maintaining that Lee was the killer. In January 2016, Patterson was found guilty and sentenced to 20 years in prison, with the judge explaining that "the court decided on a life sentence, but in view of the defendant's age, of being under 18 at the time, the sentence will be 20 years in prison."

In Patterson's appeal the court confirmed his sentence.

Media
 March 6, 1999 SBSI Want to Know It broadcast an episode about this murder 
 September 9, 2009 a film about this based on this case《The Case of Itaewon Homicide》was released.
 December 19, 2009 SBS I Want to Know It broadcast an episode about this murder 
 November 11, 2011 Commissioner K broadcast an episode about this murder and crime related to the US army in Korea

Film

The Case of Itaewon Homicide, a 2009 South Korean film based on the event

References

External links
 There is a murder but there isn't a criminal - 신동아 1999년 4월호
 United States Forces Korea Crime Eradication Campaign Headquarters

South Korea–United States relations
Anti-Americanism
1997 murders in South Korea
Itaewon